Heinrich Vuyst, O.F.M. or Heinrich Wust (died 1468) was a Roman Catholic prelate who served as Auxiliary Bishop of Paderborn (1462–1468).

Biography
Heinrich Vuyst was ordained a priest in the Order of Friars Minor.
On 31 Dec 1462, he was appointed during the papacy of Pope Pius II as Auxiliary Bishop of Paderborn and Titular Bishop of Tiflis.
On 25 Jan 1464 he was consecrated bishop.
He served as Auxiliary Bishop of Paderborn until his death in 1468.

References 

15th-century German Roman Catholic bishops
Bishops appointed by Pope Pius II
1468 deaths
Franciscan bishops